Violet P. Boede was a state legislator in Washington State. She was a Democrat from San Juan County elected in 1942.

A tribute was given for her in 1965.

References

Year of birth missing (living people)
Living people
20th-century American politicians